Île Tintamarre, also known as Flat Island, is a small island with an area of approximately . The island has no human occupants, but has been inhabited in the past. Between 1946 and 1950, it was the base for a former airline, Compagnie Aérienne Antillaise, which flew planes from the island's  airstrip.

Important Bird Area
A 665 ha area, encompassing the island and its surrounding waters, has been recognised as an Important Bird Area (IBA) by BirdLife International because it supports populations of green-throated caribs, Antillean crested hummingbirds, Caribbean elaenias, pearly-eyed thrashers and Lesser Antillean bullfinches, as well as seabird breeding colonies of red-billed tropicbirds and brown noddies.

Bibliography

References

Windward Islands
Geography of the Collectivity of Saint Martin
Important Bird Areas of the Collectivity of Saint Martin
Seabird colonies
Islands of the Collectivity of Saint Martin